Art Machine is a 2012 comedy film written and directed by Doug Karr and starring Joseph Cross, Jessica Szohr, and Joey Lauren Adams.

Cast
 Joseph Cross – Declan
 Jessica Szohr – Cassandra
 Joey Lauren Adams – Prudence
 Damian Young – Serge
 Meredith Hagner – Alexia
 Lynn Cohen – Roberta
 Robert Beitzel – Flash
 Lucas Papaelias – Agit
 Christopher Abbott – Cap’n Tar
 Stephanie Ellis – Ingrid
 Nicki Miller – Raquel
 Ashley Austin Morris - Brunette

References

External links
 
 

2012 films
Films shot in New York City
2012 comedy films
American comedy films
2010s English-language films
2010s American films